Famatina was a small genus of South American bulbous plants identified by the Chilean botanist Ravenna in 1972. Five species have been described. Molecular phylogenetic studies suggested the genus was polyphyletic, and species have been moved to other genera.

Taxonomy 
Molecular phylogenetic studies suggested the genus was polyphyletic. Of four species examined, one (F. maulensis) segregated in a clade together with members of the Traubiinae subtribe, while the remaining three (F. andina, F. cisandina, and F. herbertiana) segregated with members of subtribe Hippeastrinae. The first species is now placed in the genus Phycella, the others in the genus Zephyranthes.

Subdivision 
Described species:
 Famatina andina (Phil.) Ravenna – synonym of Zephyranthes tenuiflora  
 Famatina cisandina Ravenna  – syn. of Zephyranthes cisandina
 Famatina herbertiana (Lindl.) Ravenna – syn. of Zephyranthes graciliflora
 Famatina maulensis Ravenna – syn. of Phycella maulensis
 Famatina saxatilis Ravenna – syn. of Zephyranthes graciliflora

Distribution and habitat 
Chile and Argentinean Andes in Mediterranean zones. Moreira-Muñoz considers 2 of the five species endemic to Chile.

References

Bibliography

External links 
Chileflora
 Famatina maulensis
 Famatina cisandina

Amaryllidoideae
Historically recognized angiosperm genera